The 1989 SANFL Grand Final was an Australian rules football game contested between the Port Adelaide Football Club and the North Adelaide Football Club, held at Football Park on 7 October 1989. It was the 88th annual Grand Final of the South Australian National Football League, staged to determined the premiers of the 1989 SANFL season. The match, attended by 50,487 spectators, was won by Port Adelaide by a margin of 94 points, marking that clubs twenty-ninth premiership.

Played in blustery conditions the normally precise North Adelaide could not hit the mark with their passes and were dominated at ground level by a well coached Port Adelaide.

In a pre-game press conference before the game North Adelaide coach Mick Nunan quipped that "We have one goal in mind". North Adelaide would end up only kicking one for the whole Grand Final.

Game entertainment was provided by the Pembroke Girls choir, under the direction of Mr. Colin Curtis.

Scorecard

References 

SANFL Grand Finals
SANFL Grand Final, 1989